Nuyorican Soul is the debut studio album by Nuyorican Soul, released in 1997. It featured guest appearances from George Benson, Roy Ayers, Tito Puente, DJ Jazzy Jeff, Jocelyn Brown, Vincent Montana Jr., Salsoul Orchestra, and India. It peaked at number 25 on the UK Albums Chart.

Critical reception

John Bush of AllMusic said: "In keeping with Masters at Work's heritage, most of the album is Latin in feel and jazzy in composition, but with ever-present synths and piano runs that belie their heavy dance heritage." He called it "one of the best all-star dance albums ever recorded."

Track listing

Personnel

Musicians

Bobby Allende – congas, percussion
John Allmark – trumpet, muted trumpet
Richard Amaroso – cello
Orest Artymiw – violin
Roy Ayers – scat, vibraphone, vocals, background vocals
Catrice Barnes – background vocals
Davis A. Barnett – viola
Diane Barnett – violin
Rocco Bene – trumpet
Patricia Brown – violin
Terry Burrus – piano
Kathleen Carroll – viola
Edward Cascarella – trombone
Tony Cintron – drums
José "Cochi" Claussell – timbales
Starvin' T. Cordero – congas, percussion
Peter Daou – Fender Rhodes, keyboards
Dave Darlington – keyboards
Vidal Davis – drums
Benny Diggs – background vocals
Sarah Dubois – violin
Lisa Fischer – arranger, scat, vocal arrangement, background vocals
Richie Flores – bongos, congas, percussion
Richard Genovese – bass trombone
Edward Golazewski – baritone sax
Roger Harrington – violin
Carlos "El Nene" Henrique – bass
Ronnie James – guitar
Bashiri Johnson – percussion
Richard Jones – violin, background vocals
Olga Konopelsky – violin
Victoria Ann Matosich – viola
Andy McCloud III – bass, upright bass
Paulette McWilliams – background vocals
Albert Sterling Menendez – keyboards
Cindy Mizelle – background vocals
Diane Monroe – violin
Vince Montana – arranger, conductor, Fender Rhodes, string arrangements, vibraphone
Michael Natalie – trumpet
Peter Nocella – viola
Brian Pastor – trombone
Gene Perez – bass
Anthony Pirollo – cello
Anthony Posk – violin
Pamela Posk – violin
James Preston – Fender Rhodes
Marc Quiñones – timbales
Luisito Quintero – percussion, timbales
George Rabbai – trumpet
Christine Reeves – violin
Kimberly Reighley – flute
Melvin Roundtree – violin
David Sanchez – saxophone
Richard Schwartz – French horn
Ira Segal – guitar
Charlie Sepúlveda – trumpet
Richard Shade – background vocals
Barbara Sonies – violin
Igor Szwec – violin
Gregory Teperman – violin
Kathleen Thomas – violin
Steve Turre – percussion, trombone
Eric Velez – bongos, congas

Guest artists
George Benson – guitar, vocals
Jocelyn Brown – scat, vocals, background vocals
DJ Jazzy Jeff – turntables
India – Spanish translation, vocal arrangement, vocals, background vocals
Eddie Palmieri – piano synthesizer
Tito Puente – timbales, vibraphone
Hilton Ruiz – arranger, horn arrangements, organ (Hammond), piano
Dave Valentin – flute

Production
Kenny "Dope" Gonzalez – producer
Little Louie Vega – producer
Steven Barkan – engineer, mixing, mixing engineer
Dave Darlington – engineer, mixing, mixing engineer
Gene Leone – engineer, string engineer
Arthur Stoppe – engineer, string engineer
Oscar Monsalve – assistant engineer
Phil Pagano – assistant engineer
Dan Yashiz – assistant engineer

Charts

References

External links
 

1997 debut albums
Talkin' Loud albums
Nuyorican Soul albums